Ligretto is a card game for two to twelve players. The aim of the game is to get rid of all your cards faster than all the other players by discarding them in the middle of the table. Instead of taking turns, all players play simultaneously. The game in its present form was published in 1988 by Germany's Rosengarten Spiele (Rose Garden Games), designed by Michael Michaels. An earlier version of the game was published at the start of the 1960s. Since the year 2000, the game has been published by Schmidt-Spiele from Berlin, Germany. While Playroom Entertainment has published the game for North America and other English-speaking countries.

The game is similar to Dutch Blitz, which is based upon the original 1960s Ligretto. Both Ligretto and Dutch Blitz use specially printed cards but feature gameplay almost identical to Nerts, which is played with standard playing cards and is in turn based on Canfield, a variant of the classic Klondike Solitaire.

Description
The game uses a special deck of cards: each face is red, green, yellow, or blue, and is numbered from 1 to 10. Each player gets 40 cards (ten of each color), which have a distinctive design on the reverse, unique to that player. The game consists of 160 cards.

Before starting a game, the players shuffle their cards and put ten cards into a "stack" face up on the table. Three cards (four cards in a three-player game, five cards in a two-player game) are laid out face up next to this stack; these are called the "row". The remaining cards are kept in the player's hand.

The game starts when a player shouts "Ligretto!" and players simultaneously discard cards in the middle of the table, building colored piles in ascending numerical order according to color, and only starting new piles with a '1' card (placed anywhere near the middle of the table). New piles can be started anytime a '1' card becomes available to a player. Turns are quick, and slow players will miss opportunities to place cards as faster players add to the pile before others can react. Near-ties commonly occur among players discarding the same number card on a pile.

When one of the three "row" cards is played, the space gets filled up with the top card from the "stack".

If players are unable to discard a card from the three "row" cards or their "stack", they can look at every third card from the cards in their hand and play a card from the top of that pile if it goes on a pile on the table.

Once a player's hand has been completely passed through in this manner, it is turned over and taken back into their hand so that they can begin dealing three cards at a time.

When all players aren't capable of playing any more cards, everyone shuffles their hand and a player shouts "Ligretto!" to start things off again.

Play continues at a fast pace, with experienced players usually watching other players' rows and stacks as well as their own.

Once a player has discarded all cards from their "stack" pile, they call out "Ligretto stop!" and end the round.

Scoring
At the end of every round, all the cards on the table are turned over, returned to players, and counted, using the distinctive marking on the reverse side unique to each player.

The players get double penalty points for each of the cards remaining on their "stacks" and single bonus points for each card discarded in the middle during play. The player who ends the round does not necessarily achieve the highest score. Players can also obtain negative scores in a round.

After the scores have been calculated, each player shuffles their 40 cards, and a new round can begin.

Play continues until a player scores 100 points and wins the game.

Game packs
Ligretto comes in red, green, and blue packs. Each pack, containing cards for four players, has a different set of markings on the card backs. Having all three packs allows up to 12 players to play at a time.

See also
 Nertz, a similar game played with regular playing cards
 Dutch Blitz, a similar proprietary game

References

Game Description and Online version at brettspielwelt.de.  Accessed May 2007
Ligretto at the Austrian toy museum. Accessed May 2007

External links
Official Playroom Entertainment website
Ligretto at Schmidt publishers website. Accessed May 2007
Ligetto! Game in progress on YouTube

Card games introduced in 1988
Dedicated deck card games
Shedding-type card games
Card games for children